Farnham is a surname. The Farnham surname is a well known surname in England, and it is also known to be a Royal surname. Notable people with the surname include:

Brian Farnham, American journalist
Eliza Farnham (1815–1864), American novelist, feminist, abolitionist, and activist for prison reform
Jeremiah W. Farnham (?? - 1905), American merchant sailor and captain
John Farnham (born 1949), Australian popsinger
Joseph Farnham (1884–1931), American playwright and film screenwriter
Keith Farnham (1947–2017), American Democratic politician from Illinois
Mary J. Farnham (1833-1913), British-born American missionary and temperance advocate
Nicholas Farnham, Medieval Bishop of Durham
Paulding Farnham (1859–1927), American jewelry designer
Roger Leslie Farnham (1864 – June 5, 1951), US banker, president of Haiti's national railroad, William Nelson Cromwell associate.
Roswell Farnham (1827–1903), American Republican politician
Russell Farnham (1784–1832), American frontiersman and explorer
Sally James Farnham (1869–1943), American sculptor
Sean Farnham (born 1977), American college basketball analyst and former player
Thomas J. Farnham (1804–1848), American explorer and author
William Hudson Farnham (1869–1940), Canadian businessman and politician

See also
Farnam (disambiguation), includes list of people with name Farnam

English toponymic surnames